Greeley-Evans Transit, known by the moniker of GET, is the public transportation agency that primarily serves the cities of Greeley, Evans and Garden City. Six local routes are provided from Monday to Saturday, with dial-a-ride available on Sundays and after fixed route service ends. The Boomerang, the free campus shuttle for the University of Northern Colorado is also operated by the agency. Over the past few years the bus system has made significant improvements which have included increased frequencies, increased hours and new routes.  In addition to this, new technology has been added to make it easier to ride the bus system such as RouteShout and GETrax which can be found on the website. On January 2, 2020, a regional service called the Poudre Express started service between Greeley and Fort Collins via Windsor.

Route list
Route 1 - Aims College/10th Street/Northridge High School/Centerplace Dr
Route 2 -  East Greeley/Evans/Greeley Mall
Route 3 - Downtown/Island Grove/Friendly Village/Greeley West High School/Greeley Mall
Route 4  - Downtown/Hospital/Cottonwood Square/Centennial Library/Greeley Mall
Route 5 - Downtown/UNC/University Center/Greeley Mall
Route 6 - Human Services/O Street
Poudre Express Regional - Greeley/Windsor/Fort Collins
UNC Boomerang - Gunther Hall/Michener Library (Only when UNC is in regular session)

References

External links
 http://www.greeleyevanstransit.com
 GETrax - http://67.220.100.109:52052/portal/fr2/index.jsf

Transportation in Weld County, Colorado
Bus transportation in Colorado
Transit agencies in Colorado